The 7th Standing Committee of the Supreme People's Assembly (SPA) was elected by the 1st Session of the 7th Supreme People's Assembly on 5 April 1982. It was replaced on 30 December 1986 by the 8th SPA Standing Committee.

Officers

Chairman

Vice Chairman

Secretary

Members

Replacements

References

Citations

Bibliography
Books:
 

7th Supreme People's Assembly
Presidium of the Supreme People's Assembly
1982 establishments in North Korea
1986 disestablishments in North Korea